Kikoboga  Airstrip  is an airstrip serving the Mikumi National Park in the Morogoro Region of Tanzania.

See also

 List of airports in Tanzania
 Transport in Tanzania

References

External links
OpenStreetMap - Mikumi
OurAirports - Mikumi

Airstrips in Tanzania
Buildings and structures in the Morogoro Region